Alam Impian is a township in Shah Alam. The township was  launched in 2006. It has graffiti walls, an art gallery, linear parks, an amphitheatre, street art and a 31-acre central town park.

Access
Alam Impian is accessible via the Lebuhraya Kemuning–Shah Alam Highway (LKSA) , the KESAS  506, the Federal Highway and the ELITE .

References

Townships in Selangor